Borger or Börger is a name, primarily used as a surname.

Notable people with the name include:

Surname 
A. P. (Ace) Borger (1888–1934), American town builder
Andrew Borger, American drummer
Asaf Borger, better known by his moniker Borgore
Bill Borger (born 1974),  Canadian Businessman
David Borger (born 1969),  Australian politician 
Egon Börger (born 1946), German computer scientist 
Elias Annes Borger (born 1784), Dutch poet
Gloria Borger (born 1952), American journalist
Jamie Borger, (born 1964), Swedish drummer
Jessica Borger, Australian immunologist and STEM advocate
John Borger (Canadian football) (born 1935), former Canadian football player
Julian Borger, British journalist
Karla Borger, German beach volleyball player
Nicolai Borger (born 1974), German actor and writer
Patrik Borger (born 1979), German football coach and former footballer
Rykle Borger, German assyriologist
Sebastian Borger, German journalist

Given name 
Borger Breeveld (born 1944), Surinamese actor and journalist
Borger Kristoffersson Hoen (1799–1877), Norwegian farmer and politician
Borger A. Lenth (born 1937), Norwegian civil servant, banker and lawyer
Borger Thomas (born 1995), Norwegian professional footballer